Esperia is a municipality in Italy.

Esperia may also refer to:

 Esperia (moth), a genus of the concealer moth family
 Esperia, a synonym of Kirinia, a genus of butterflies
 Banca Esperia, an Italian bank
 Esperia Pony, a breed of pony 
 Esperia alpine botanical garden, an alpine botanical garden in Italy
 Study Association Esperia, the study association for the study European Languages and Cultures in Groningen, the Netherlands

See also
 
 Hesperia (disambiguation)
 F.C. Esperia Viareggio, an Italian football club, now S.S.D. Viareggio 2014